The 1971 Grand Prix German Open was a combined men's and women's tennis tournament played on outdoor red clay courts. It was the 63rd edition of the tournament. The event was part of the 1971 Pepsi-Cola Grand Prix circuit and categorized as a B Class tournament. It took place at the Am Rothenbaum in Hamburg, West Germany, from 17 May through 23 May 1971. Andrés Gimeno and Billie Jean King won the singles titles.

Finals

Men's singles
 Andrés Gimeno defeated  Péter Szőke 6–3, 6–2, 6–2

Women's singles
 Billie Jean King defeated  Helga Masthoff 6–3, 6–2

Men's doubles
 John Alexander /  Andrés Gimeno defeated  Dick Crealy /  Allan Stone 6–4, 7–5, 7–9, 6–4

Women's doubles
 Rosie Casals /  Billie Jean King defeated  Helga Masthoff /  Heide Orth 6–2, 6–1

Mixed doubles
 Heide Orth /  Jürgen Fassbender defeated  Helga Hösl /  Harald Elschenbroich 6–4, 3–6, 6–2

References

External links
  
   
 Association of Tennis Professionals (ATP) tournament profile
 International Tennis Federation (ITF) tournament edition details

German Open
Hamburg European Open
1971 in West German sport
German